Gimpo is a city in Gyeonggi Province, South Korea. It borders Incheon, with which it shares the South Korean side of the Han River estuary, as well as Seoul and the lesser cities of Paju and Goyang. North Korea is across the Han River. The current mayor is Jeong Hayoung. The city's population of more than 300,000 is made up of more than 71,000 households.

Gimpo International Airport (formerly Kimpo International Airport) used to be located inside the city, but is now part of Seoul. Tertiary educational institutions located in the city include Kimpo College and Joong-ang Seungga University. The city has 27 elementary schools, 12 middle schools, and 8 high schools, including Gimpo Foreign Language High School. Three elementary schools, two middle schools, and two high schools are located in the area of Tongjin.

Modern history
In 1914, Yangcheon County and Gimpo County were merged. Yangcheon County was separated into two towns (Yangdong and Yangseo). In 1958, Yeouido International Airport was relocated to Gimpo. In 1963, Yangdong and Yangseo towns were incorporated into Yeongdeungpo-gu; it includes Gimpo International Airport. In 1973, Gyeyang and Ojeong towns of Bucheon were transferred to Gimpo. In 1989, parts of Gyeyang town were ceded to Incheon, giving Incheon a border with southwestern Seoul. And 1995, Geomdan region was ceded to Incheon.
In 1998, Gimpo was promoted to a city. Since the Hangang New Town was announced in 2003, the population of the city has soared. Gimpo Light Rail was opened in 2019 for the sake of population growth and the convenience of transportation in the new Han River city. This line connects Yangchon Station and Gimpo Airport Station, which is a two-car light-rail line. In response, some citizens are demanding more cars or extension of Seoul Subway Line No. 5 in preparation for the soaring demand for transportation in the future.
The airport at Kimpo (Gimpo) was known as "K-14" Air Force Base during the Korean War. Sabre jets were based and operated from K-14 to "Mig Alley" located in the northwestern area of North Korea, and where air combat would take place with enemy Mig aircraft. A large number of U.S. Air Force bases were located throughout South Korea during the Korean War, and each of them had a "K" number, with the "K" meaning Korea.

Climate
Gimpo has a monsoon-influenced humid continental climate (Köppen: Dwa) with cold, dry winters and hot, rainy summers.

Statistics

Industry

Regional Gross Domestic Product 
Gimpo City's gross domestic product in 2012 was 16.98 trillion won, accounting for 2.2% of the total in Gyeonggi Province. Among them, agriculture, forestry, and fisheries (primary industry) accounted for 248.5 billion won. In contrast, mining and manufacturing (second industry) accounted for 63.1% of the total, while commercial and service industries account for 35.3%, or 5.6869 trillion won. In the second industrial sector, wholesale and retail businesses (5.4%), construction (4.7%), real estate and rental businesses (3.7%), and electricity, gas, steam, and water projects (3.0%) accounted for a large portion, as the new Gimpo Han River is built.

Status of employees 
In 2014, the Gimpo city industry's total number stood at 129,440, accounting for 2.9% of the total number of workers in Gyeonggi Province. Among them, agriculture and forestry (primary industry) account for 93 people. In contrast, mining and manufacturing (second industry) account for 48.6% of 62,946, while commercial and service industries (third industry) account for 51.3% with 66,401. The secondary industry is higher than the overall proportion of Gyeonggi Province (27.1%), and the tertiary industry is lower than the overall proportion of Gyeonggi Province (72.9%). In the third industrial sector, wholesale and retail (12.1%), lodging and restaurant (7.7%), education and services (6.2%), and health and social welfare (5.2%).

Resident Population and Floating Population 
As of 2010, Gimpo's city had 215,050 residents and 227,159 weekly population, with the weekly population index high at 106. The number of people flowing in from commuting to work is 45,757. The number of people leaving from school is 31,213, and 2,687 and 5,122 more people flowing from school, a common phenomenon in the outskirts of the Seoul metropolitan area where many industrial facilities have been relocated.

Tourist spots
 Munsu Fortress
 Jangneung
 Deokpojin
 Aegi Peak
 Daemyeong Port
 DMZ Peace Trail
 Czong Institute for Contemporary Art (CICA Museum)

Sister cities
 Glendale, California, United States
 Hampyeong, South Jeolla, South Korea
 Xinmin, Liaoning, China
 Heze, Shandong, China

See also
 List of cities in South Korea
 Geography of South Korea
 Seoul National Capital Area
 Gimpo International Airport
 Gimpo Peninsula

References

External links
City government website (in English)
City government website (in Korean)

 

 
Cities in Gyeonggi Province